New Plymouth is a city in New Zealand.

New Plymouth may also refer to:

New Plymouth (New Zealand electorate), for the city
New Plymouth, Idaho, in the United States
New Plymouth, Ohio, in the United States
New Plymouth, Livingston Island, Antarctica
Plymouth Colony, in New England, the United States
New Plymouth is a settlement on Green Turtle Cay in the Bahamas founded in the 1700s.  Population is around 450.

See also
Plymouth (disambiguation)